USS Merak (AF-21), the second Navy ship of the name, was the United Fruit Company cargo and passenger liner Veragua that served as a United States Navy  in World War II.

Veragua was built for United Fruit's subsidiary United Mail Steamship Company by Bethlehem Shipbuilding Corporation, Fore River Plant, Quincy, Massachusetts. The ship was one of six nearly identical ships with three each built by Newport News Shipbuilding and Drydock Company and Bethlehem Shipbuilding.

The ships were designed to take advantage of U.S. subsidies, including mail contracts, and designated by the line as its "Mail class" vessels to meet the company's primary purpose of refrigerated  banana transport with passenger and mail being important sources of revenue. Veragua, launched 23 April 1932 and delivered 5 August was one of three ships assigned to the company's Atlantic routes to Panama allowing an intercoastal connection with the three ships assigned to the Pacific.

Veragua was delivered to the War Shipping Administration (WSA) in March 1942 for wartime operation under bareboat charter. The Navy acquired the ship from WSA under sub bareboat charter at the same time, commissioning the ship 8 May 1942 as Merak designated AF-21 after modifications were made for wartime naval service. The ship served in the Atlantic throughout the war. After decommissioning of Merak in June 1946 Veragua was reconverted to commercial operations and then returned to the company for resumption of service on a similar route as before the war. The ship, with two sister ships, was transferred to its British subsidiary Elders and Fyffes to be renamed Sinaloa operating until 1965 when the ship was scrapped.

Construction 
Veragua, named for a mountain range in Panama, was the last of six nearly identical ships, the first being , launched for the United Mail Steamship Company, a United Fruit Company subsidiary. The six ships were built to a common design by two builders, Newport News Shipbuilding and Drydock Company and Bethlehem Shipbuilding.

United Fruit's primary business was transport of bananas from Central and South America with passengers, mail and general cargo as important components. The design was thus driven by the special requirements of a refrigerated fruit carrier, in effect an enhanced "banana boat", in which refrigeration and banana handling capability was incorporated in the basic design. An expensive feature, required by the government for loans, was the "two compartment" rule requiring the ship to stay afloat with any two compartments flooded. The ships were subdivided into nine compartments by eight watertight bulkheads. As a result of shorter compartments more refrigeration equipment was required driving costs and requiring larger ships than the former "banana boats" for the same amount of fruit cargo. Sixteen refrigerated cargo compartments were located in two cork insulated holds forward and two aft of the central superstructure with York Ice Machinery Corporation refrigeration units located below the orlop deck aft. The company designated the ships as its "Mail class" due to their design to meet requirements for mail carriage subsidies.

Bethlehem Shipbuilding Corporation of Quincy, Massachusetts built the ship as yard hull 1446 with launch on 23 April 1932 and delivery in August 1932. Design was based on Antigua, the first of the ships from Bethlehem Shipbuilding Corporation, with slight variance from the Newport News implementation. Displacement tonnage to the designed waterline was 10,928, gross 7,035.12 and net 3,523 with cargo capacities of 240,070 cubic feet refrigerated space in two holds forward, two aft and two special low temperature holds aft with 5,370 cubic feet of mail and baggage storage. Normal service speed of 17.5 knots was achieved by two turbo-electric transmission with of 10,500 normal shaft horsepower and some of the ships reached 19 knots during trials.

Commercial service 
Veragua was delivered 5 August 1932 and made her maiden voyage on 11 August to Havana, Kingston, Cristobal and Limón. Scheduled sailings for January through March 1933 show Veragua along with Quirigua  and Peten operating on a New York, Havana, Kingston, Cristobal, Limón and return to New York omitting Kingston as a port of call. The other three, Antigua, Talamanca and Chiriqui meanwhile operated on a San Francisco to Balboa route with return to San Francisco via Puerto Armuelles and Los Angeles. An intercoastal service for passengers and cargo was formed by the ships connecting in Panama. That schedule remained through 1936. In January 1939 all the ships operated on the New York to Panama route.

On 2 February 1940 naval historian Samuel E. Morison and his Harvard Columbus Expedition returned to New York aboard Veragua after retracing the voyages of Christopher Columbus since the previous August.

US Navy service 
On 20 March 1942 United Fruit delivered Veragua to the War Shipping Administration (WSA) at New Orleans under bareboat charter. Simultaneously the Navy acquired the ship under sub bareboat charter. The ship was converted to naval use by Todd Pacific Shipyards of Galveston, Texas and commissioned Merak, designated AF-21, on 8 May 1942, commanded by Cmdr L.E. Divoll.

shakedown training began on her maiden Navy voyage to Charleston, South Carolina. By 20 March 1943 she completed 10 voyages in convoy from east coast ports to Caribbean islands. She then made one supply voyage to Reykjavík, Iceland, arriving on 10 April. She then made two short deliveries to Cuba before making her first transatlantic crossing in July, delivering men, mail, and stores in Algeria, North Africa. Between further Caribbean trips, Merak voyaged to both Sicily and Scotland before the end of 1943.

She continued Caribbean sailings and transatlantic voyages until February 1945, including four crossings from Bayonne, New Jersey, to Italian ports. After a brief drydocking she supplied ships and bases from Iceland to Trinidad. On her last voyage to Reykjavík, on 14 July 1946 a blizzard blew her ashore while anchored at Argentia, Newfoundland. She was freed by tugs and completed her voyage. She then made two more trips to San Juan, Puerto Rico, and Trinidad before being released by the Navy.

Merak’s crew were awarded the following medals: American Campaign Medal, Europe-Africa-Middle East Campaign Medal and World War II Victory Medal.

Post-war commercial service 
On 21 June 1946 Merak was decommissioned at New York and returned the ship to WSA.  Veragua was then operated by United Fruit as WSA's agent under a General Agency Agreement to be converted back to commercial service and then returned to the company on 8 January 1948.  The April to December 1950 schedule shows the ship on a New Orleans, Havana, Puerto Barrios and direct return to New Orleans with 1952 showing New Orleans, Cristobal, Tela and direct return to New Orleans.

Sale 
In December 1958 United Fruit transferred Veragua and her sisters Quirigua and Talamanca to its British subsidiary Elders and Fyffes, which changed Veraguas name to SS Sinaloa. She was scrapped in Ghent, Belgium in 1965.

Footnotes

References

External links

 NavSource Online: Service Ship Photo Archive - AF-21 Merak

1932 ships
Ships built in Quincy, Massachusetts
Ships of the United Fruit Company
Mizar-class stores ships